The 1981 Bavarian Tennis Championships was a men's Grand Prix Tennis Circuit tournament held in Munich, West Germany which was played on outdoor clay courts. It was the 65th edition of the tournament and was held form 18 May through 24 May 1981. Chris Lewis won the singles title.

Finals

Singles

 Chris Lewis defeated  Christophe Roger-Vasselin 4–6, 6–2, 2–6, 6–1, 6–1
 It was Lewis's 2nd title of the year and the 7th of his career.

Doubles

 David Carter /  Paul Kronk defeated  Eric Fromm /  Shlomo Glickstein 6–3, 6–4
 It was Carter's 3rd title of the year and the 3rd of his career. It was Kronk's 3rd title of the year and the 4th of his career.

References

External links 
 ATP Tournament profile
 

BMW Open
 
Bavarian International Tennis Championships
Bavarian Tennis Championships
Bavarian Tennis Championships
Bavarian Tennis Championships
German